The Shire of South Gippsland is a local government area in Victoria, Australia, located in the south-eastern part of the state.

It includes the towns of Leongatha, Korumburra, Foster, Poowong, Mirboo North and Meeniyan. It was formed in 1994 from the amalgamation of the former Shire of South Gippsland with the Shire of Mirboo, and parts of the Shire of Korumburra and Shire of Woorayl.

The Shire is governed and administered by the South Gippsland Shire Council; its seat of local government and administrative centre is located at the council headquarters in Leongatha, it also has a service centre located in Mirboo North. The Shire is named after the Gippsland region, in which the LGA occupies the southernmost portion, including Wilsons Promontory at the southern tip of the Australian continent.

Council

Current composition
The council is composed of three wards and nine councillors, with three councillors per ward elected to represent each ward. The entire council were sacked by the state government on 19 June 2019 due to bullying allegations and general dysfunctionality. The council was run by administrators until 2021 when a new council was elected.

Administration and governance
The council meets in the council chambers at the council headquarters in the Leongatha Municipal Offices, which is also the location of the council's administrative activities. It also provides customer services at both its administrative centre in Leongatha, and its service centre in Mirboo North.

Townships and localities
The 2021 census, the shire had a population of 30,577 up from 28,703 in the 2016 census

^ - Territory divided with another LGA
* - Not noted in 2016 Census
# - Not noted in 2021 Census

See also
List of localities (Victoria)

References

External links
South Gippsland Shire Council official website
Metlink local public transport map 
Link to Land Victoria interactive maps

Local government areas of Victoria (Australia)
Gippsland (region)